Hypselobarbus micropogon, the Korhi barb, is a species of cyprinid fish from India where it is restricted to the headwaters of Kaveri.

Footnotes 

 

Hypselobarbus
Fish described in 1842